The 2011–12 Israeli Premier League was the thirteenth season since its introduction in 1999 and the 70th season of top-tier football in Israel. It began on 20 August 2011 and ended on 12 May 2012. Maccabi Haifa were the defending champions.

Ironi Kiryat Shmona secured the title with a 0–0 draw against Hapoel Tel Aviv on 2 April 2012. This was their first Israeli league title, This draw gave Ironi Kiryat Shmona a 16-point advantage over the second-place team Hapoel Tel Aviv with five more rounds to go.

Structural changes
There was three structural changes:
The middle playoff was cancelled, with only top and bottom playoff to be contested by eight teams each, according to their regular season placement. with each team plays 37 matches.
The points were no longer halved after the regular season.
There will be three relegated teams, and only one promoted team from Liga Leumit.

Teams

A total of sixteen teams are competing in the league, including fourteen sides from the 2010–11 season and two promoted teams from the 2010–11 Liga Leumit.

Hapoel Ashkelon and Hapoel Ramat Gan were directly relegated to the 2011–12 Liga Leumit after finishing the 2010–11 season in the bottom two places.

Two teams were directly promoted from the 2010–11 Liga Leumit. These were champions Ironi Ramat HaSharon and the runners-up Hapoel Rishon LeZion.

 While Teddy Stadium was in renovation. Beitar Jerusalem hosted their home games in alternative stadia until the stadium was completed on 20 November 2011. Beitar chose to host its games in Ramat Gan Stadium.
 Hapoel Acre played their first home game at the Ilut Stadium while their stadium was under construction. 
 The Petah Tikva Municipal Stadium was demolished. Hapoel and Maccabi Petah Tikva hosted their home games in alternative stadia until the new Petah Tikva Stadium was fully constructed in December 2011. Both Hapoel and Maccabi hosted its games in Ramat Gan Stadium.
 Ironi Ramat HaSharon played their home games at the Winter Stadium until March 2012 while their stadium was under construction.

Managerial changes

 Gili Landau refused to reduce his salary and was resigned, he was appointed the following day after his salary was intact. 
 Nir Levine was acted as caretaker manager for a month until his appointment as manager on 9 January 2012.
 Ron Tziblin acted as caretaker manager only once, in the club Toto Cup Al semi-finals against Maccabi Petah Tikva.

Regular season

Table

Results

Playoffs
Key numbers for pairing determination (number marks position after 30 games):

Top playoff

Table

Results

Bottom playoff

Table

Results

Top goalscorers

Season statistics

Scoring
First goal of the season:  Firas Mugrabi for Maccabi Netanya against Maccabi Haifa, 21st minute (20 August 2011)
Widest winning margin: 6 goals – Hapoel Tel Aviv 6–0 Hapoel Rishon LeZion (29 October 2011)
Most goals in a match: 10 goals – Hapoel Tel Aviv 7–3 Maccabi Netanya (21 January 2012)
Most goals in a half: 5 goals – 
Bnei Yehuda 4–1 Hapoel Acre, 0–0 at half-time (17 December 2011)
Bnei Yehuda 5–1 Hapoel Petah Tikva, 1–0 at half-time (7 January 2012)
Hapoel Tel Aviv 7–3 Maccabi Netanya (both halves), 3–2 at half-time (21 January 2012)
Maccabi Tel Aviv 5–2 Bnei Sakhnin, 5–0 at half-time (31 March 2012)
Most goals in a match by one player: 4 goals – Wiyam Amashe for Maccabi Haifa against Maccabi Netanya (20 August 2011)
Most goals scored by a losing team: 3 goals
Bnei Sakhnin 4–3 Hapoel Be'er Sheva (27 August 2011)
Hapoel Tel Aviv 7–3 Maccabi Netanya (21 January 2012)
Bnei Yehuda 4–3 Maccabi Tel Aviv (9 May 2012)

Discipline
First yellow card of the season:  Mohammad Ghadir for Maccabi Haifa against Maccabi Netanya, 40th minute (20 August 2011)
First red card of the season:  Eyal Tartazky for Hapoel Haifa against Ironi Kiryat Shmona, 68th minute (20 August 2011)

See also
 2011–12 Israel State Cup
 2011–12 Toto Cup Al

References

Israeli Premier League seasons
1
Israeli Premier League